New Salem is an unincorporated community in Cowley County, Kansas, United States.  As of the 2020 census, the population of the community and nearby areas was 58.

History
A post office was opened in New Salem in 1872, and remained in operation until it was discontinued in 1972.

Demographics

For statistical purposes, the United States Census Bureau has defined New Salem as a census-designated place (CDP).

Education
The community is served by Winfield USD 465 public school district.

References

Further reading

External links
 Cowley County maps: Current, Historic, KDOT

Unincorporated communities in Cowley County, Kansas
Unincorporated communities in Kansas